Yasmin Levy (born December 23, 1975) is an Israeli singer-songwriter of Judeo-Spanish music.

Biography
Yasmin Levy was born on December 23, 1975, in  Baka, Jerusalem. She is of Sephardic Jewish descent. Her parents were immigrants from Turkey. 

Her father, Yitzhak Isaac Levy (1919–1977), was a composer and hazzan (cantor), as well as a pioneer researcher into the history of the Ladino music and culture of Spanish Jewry and its diaspora, being the editor of the Ladino language magazine Aki Yerushalayim. He died when Levy was just one year old, but she names him as one of her greatest musical influences.

Career
With her distinctive and emotive style, Levy has brought a new interpretation to the medieval Judeo-Spanish (Ladino) song by incorporating more "modern" sounds of Andalusian flamenco and traditional Turkish music as well as combining instruments like the darbuka, oud, violin, cello, and piano.

Her debut album was Romance & Yasmin, which was followed by her second album La Judería.

On her second album, La Judería, she also covered the popular songs "Gracias a la Vida" by Violeta Parra and "Nací en Álamo" from the film Vengo, directed by Tony Gatlif, which in its original version won the 2001 César Award for Best Music Written for a Film (itself being a cover of "The Song of the Gypsies", written by Greek songwriter Dionysis Tsaknis in 1990)..

In her own words in 2007:

Other roles 
Levy is a goodwill ambassador for the charity Children of Peace.

Accolades 
In 2006, Levy was nominated in the "Culture Crossing" category for the fRoots / BBC Radio 3 World Music Awards.

In 2008 Levy's work earned her the Anna Lindh Euro-Mediterranean Foundation Award for promoting cross-cultural dialogue between musicians from three cultures.

The Sunday Times named Sentir as one of the Top 100 albums of 2009, and placed it in their Top 10 World Music releases of the year.

Discography

Full albums
 2004: Romance & Yasmin
 2005: La Judería
 2006: Live at the Tower of David, Jerusalem
 2007: Mano Suave
 2009: Sentir
 2012: Libertad
 2014: Tango
 2017: "Rak Od Layla Echad" ('Just one more night')
 2021: Voice & Piano

Singles for movie soundtracks
 2011: "Jaco", for My Sweet Canary  (featuring the oud player Tomer Katz)
 2011: "Una Pastora", for My Sweet Canary (featuring the qanun player Mumin Sesler)

Collaborations
 2008: Tzur Mishelo Achalnu, for Avoda Ivrit 2, featuring Shlomo Bar
 2010: Tzur Mishelo Achalnu, for Kol HaNeshama, featuring Shlomo Bar
 2012: Yigdal, for Yehuda Halevi Pinat Ibn Gabirol - The Collection

References

Further reading
 

1975 births
21st-century Israeli women singers
Israeli Sephardi Jews
Israeli people of Turkish-Jewish descent
Judaeo-Spanish-language singers
Living people
People from Jerusalem
Israeli Mizrahi Jews